Paul Harvey Peters (born September 24, 1982) is the non-Executive Board Chair of online conference software provider ExOrdo and from 2015-2021 was the Chief Executive Officer of the Open Access publisher Hindawi. He is past Chair of the Board of Crossref and was President of the Open Access Scholarly Publishers Association (OASPA) from 2013 to 2019. Peters is known for his work as an advocate for Open Access, open infrastructure for  Open Science, and research integrity in the published literature.

Early life
Paul Harvey Peters was born in Cambridge, Massachusetts on September 24, 1982 where his parents both taught chemistry at Harvard. The family moved to Boulder, Colorado in 1984 where Paul went to Bixby Elementary School, Baseline Middle School, and Fairview High School.

Education
He was educated at the College of William and Mary from 2000 to 2004 where he completed his bachelor's degree in Middle Eastern Studies. While at William and Mary, he spent his junior year abroad at the American University in Cairo (AUC).

Professional life
Upon finishing college aged 21, Peters returned to Cairo. He applied for a temporary copy editing position at Hindawi, but was then hired to develop Hindawi's Open Access journal program. At the time, Hindawi was a subscription publisher with a portfolio of 14 journals. He led the conversion of Hindawi’s journal portfolio to open access, making it one of the first subscription publishers to convert fully to an APC-funded open access model in 2007.

In 2008, Hindawi joined nine other publishers to found the Open Access Scholarly Publishers Association (OASPA), which was born out of the Nordic Conference on Scholarly Communications. He was a founding board member of OASPA and was elected President of the organization on March 15, 2013.

In 2015, he was appointed Chief Executive Officer of Hindawi. He restructured the company creating a new limited liability company located in London, Hindawi Ltd. In 2017, he instigated Hindawi’s resignation from the International Association of Scientific, Technical, and Medical Publishers (STM) in protest over their lack of support for open access publishing. Peters has also been critical of the blacklisting of certain open access journals by librarian Jeffrey Beall. 

Peters served as a Nominated Member on the European Commission’s working group on the development and implementation of open science in Europe – the European Open Science Policy Platform from 2016 to 2017. He has been on the Board of Directors of Crossref since 2009 where he is currently the Board Chair, and he is a former board member of the International Association of Scientific, Technical, and Medical Publishers. He appeared in the 2018 feature length documentary about open access, Paywall: the business of scholarship.

In 2018, Paul Peters proposed the concept of the OA Switchboard and convened a meeting of key stakeholders in December 2018 to develop the idea. The OA Switchboard was formally launched on 31 January 2020.

In February 2021, having successfully completed the sale of Hindawi to Wiley for $298m  he announced his intention to leave his role as CEO to focus full time on his family  In May 2022 Peters was appointed as non-Executive Board Chair of ExOrdo a provider of cloud-based conferencing software

Personal life
Peters has lived in London since 2013. He is an amateur skydiver and a vegan. On 20 July 2019 he married Maria Burnuz in London. In January 2021 their son was born.

Family
His mother is Veronica Vaida is an atmospheric chemist and his father, Kevin Peters is an emeritus professor of chemistry (both at the University of Colorado Boulder). He has one sister, Katherine Heaton (née Peters) who is an attorney.

References

External links 

 
 Interview on the challenges of sustainability (SPARC-ACRL Forum on Emerging Issues in Scholarly Communication, 2007)
 Lecture at the 13th Berlin Open Access Conference, March 2017
 Presentation at the 13th Berlin Open Access Conference, March 2017

1982 births
Living people
The American University in Cairo alumni
College of William & Mary alumni
Businesspeople from Boulder, Colorado
Open access activists
American publishing chief executives